Stephen E. (Steve) Calvert, PhD, FRSC (born December 30, 1935) is a professor emeritus at the University of British Columbia. He has specialized in the study of chemical and geochemical oceanography. His work has shed light on the factors responsible for the wide compositional variability of marine sediments, the controls on organic matter burial and nutrient utilization in the ocean.

Calvert utilizes a combination of organic, inorganic and stable isotopic information to reconstruct past sea surface temperatures, plankton production, terrestrial sediment supply and transport modes, nutrient utilization and bottom water oxygen concentrations.

Early life and career
Calvert was born in London, England in 1935. He studied at the University of Reading, obtaining a bachelor of science degree in 1958. Later, he emigrated to Canada, where he received his Ph.D. from Scripps Institution of Oceanography in 1964. Calvert is also a member of the UCSD Alumni Association. Currently, Calvert is a professor emeritus at the University of British Columbia.

Honours
1992, made a fellow of the Royal Society of Canada
2000, awarded the Pettersson Bronze Medal by the Royal Swedish Academy of Sciences
2001, awarded the Logan Medal by the Geological Association of Canada
2001, made a fellow of the American Geophysical Union

Works
Calvert has authored or coauthored numerous papers regarding geochemical oceanography:
 
 
 

He has also contributed to and reviewed multiple published books, including:
 Proxies in Late Cenozoic Paleoceanography Contributor Elsevier May 25, 2007 
 The Monterey Formation: From Rocks to Molecules Review Columbia University Press 2001

References
University of British Columbia Faculty bio
UBC Awards

External links
Official list of Calvert's publications

Alumni of the University of Reading
Canadian geologists
Fellows of the Royal Society of Canada
Academic staff of the University of British Columbia
Scripps Institution of Oceanography alumni
Logan Medal recipients
1935 births
Living people
Fellows of the American Geophysical Union